Dalibor is a Czech opera in three acts by Bedřich Smetana. The libretto was written in German by Josef Wenzig, and translated into Czech by Ervin Špindler. It was first performed at the New Town Theatre in Prague on 16 May  1868. The opera received criticism at the time for being overly influenced by German opera, including that of Richard Wagner's Lohengrin.

The plot bears a resemblance to that of Ludwig van Beethoven's opera Fidelio, in that the central female characters in each opera disguise themselves in male clothing to try to save the hero.

Performance history
Smetana had great affection for the opera, but because of the lukewarm reception, died thinking that he had failed with this opera. The revival in 1886, however, two years after the composer's death, was a success. In the 1890s, the opera received productions in Zagreb, Munich, and Hamburg. Gustav Mahler conducted an 1892 production in Vienna.

Synopsis
Time: 15th century
Place: Prague

Act 1
Dalibor, a Czech Knight is on trial before the king for having murdered the burgrave of Ploskovice in revenge for execution of his friend, the musician Zdeněk. At the trial, the king calls upon the burgrave's sister, Milada, who demands his execution. As Dalibor is brought in, the crowd rises in support of him. When Dalibor tells of his friend's capture and murder the court reduces his sentence from death to lifetime imprisonment. Milada painfully realized that she is falling in love with Dalibor, and in collusion with Jitka, an orphan befriended by the knight, she resolves to set him free.

Act 2
After a scene in a mercenary camp, where Jitka and her lover Vítek plot to free Dalibor, Milada enters the prison disguised as a boy and finds employment with Dalibor's jailer, Beneš. She charms the jailer into allowing her into dungeon where Dalibor is being held, to give him his friend's violin. The knight is dreaming, and initially thinks Milada is a reincarnation of his beloved Zdeněk. Then in a passionate duet, they sing of their joy in having found each other.

Act 3
In the dungeon, Dalibor looks forward to escape (singing his famous Song to Freedom) but feeling it is a bad omen when one of the strings of Zdeněk's violin breaks. The plot to bribe Beneš fails, and the jailer informs the king of their attempted escape. Taking the advice of his council, the king orders Dalibor's death. Milada, waiting outside the prison, hears the tolling of the bell that signals Dalibor's execution. Accompanied by her followers, she storms the castle, where, after rescuing Dalibor, she is wounded and dies in his arms. Dalibor stabs himself and is united in death with his beloved. An alternative ending has Dalibor executed before Milada can rescue him.

Roles

Recordings
In Czech
1950, Jaroslav Krombholc (conductor), Prague National Theatre Chorus and Orchestra; Václav Bednář, Beno Blachut, Teodor Šrubař, Karel Kalaš, Antonín Votava, Marie Podvalová, Štefa Petrová, Jan Hadraba, Jaroslav Kubala, Josef Loskot, Ferdinand Kotas, František Trnka
1967, Jaroslav Krombholc, (conductor), Prague National Theatre Chorus and Orchestra; Jindřich Jindrák, Vilém Přibyl, Antonín Švorc, Jaroslav Horáček, Zdeněk Švehla, Naděžda Kniplová, Svobodová-Janků, Jedlička
1977, Eve Queler, (conductor), Opera Orchestra of New York and New York Choral Society; Allan Monk, Nicolai Gedda, Harlan Foss, Paul Plishka, John Carpenter, Teresa Kubiak, Nadia Šormová, Raymond Gniewek
1995, Zdeněk Košler (conductor), Prague National Theatre Chorus and Orchestra; Eva Urbanová, Jiřina Marková, Leo Marian Vodička, Ivan Kusnjer, Miroslav Kopp, Vratislav Kříž, Jiří Kalendovský, Bohuslav Maršík
1999, Yoram David (conductor), Orchestra e Coro del Teatro Lirico di Cagliari; Eva Urbanová, Valerij Popov, Valeri Alexejev, Dagmar Schellenberger, Jiri Kalendovsky, Damir Basyrov, Valentin Prolat, Carmine Monaco, Alexandr Blagodarnyi, Bruno Pestarino
 2015, Jiří Bělohlávek (conductor), BBC Singers, BBC Symphony Orchestra; Dana Burašová, Alžběta Poláčková, Richard Samek, Aleš Voráček, Ivan Kusnjer, Svatopluk Sem, Jan Stava

In German
1969, Josef Krips (conductor), Orchestra and chorus Vienna State Opera; Eberhard Wächter, Ludovico Spiess, Oskar Czerwenka, Walter Kreppel, Adolf Dallapozza, Tugomir Franc, Leonie Rysanek, Lotte Rysanek

In English
1955, Vilém Tauský (conductor), BBC Philharmonia Orchestra and Chorus; Joan Hammond (soprano), Richard Lewis (tenor), Suzanne Danco (soprano), Alexander Young (tenor), Dennis Noble (baritone), Ian Blair (baritone), Stanley Clarkson (bass).
1969, Vilém Tauský (conductor), BBC Orchestra and Chorus; Pauline Tinsley (soprano), Robert Jones (tenor), Gwyn Griffiths (baritone), Joseph Ward (tenor).

In Italian
1973, Luigi Toffolo (conductor), Orchestra Sinfonica e coro di Milano della RAI; Radmila Bakočević (soprano); Ludovic Spiess (tenor); Nikola Mitić (baritone); Dora Carral (mezzo-soprano); Piero De Palma (tenor); Giannicola Pigliucci (basso).

References
Notes

Sources
Warrack, John and West, Ewan, The Oxford Dictionary of Opera New York: OUP: 1992

External links
 
 English-language introduction to Dalibor from Supraphon web site

Operas by Bedřich Smetana
Czech-language operas
Operas
Rescue operas
1868 operas